Joan Rubió y Bellver (24 April 1870 – 30 November 1952) was a Spanish architect famous for his contributions to the Catalan Modernista movement.

Biography

Early life, family
Rubió was born in Reus, Province of Tarragona. He was also the brother of the military engineer Marià Rubió i Bellver and uncle of the architect Nicolau Maria Rubió i Tudurí and the engineer Santiago Rubió i Tudurí.

Design career
A keen disciple of Antoni Gaudí,  he  collaborated with him until 1905, on such works as La Sagrada Família, the Casa Batlló, the Casa Calvet, the Torre Bellesguard and Parc Güell in Barcelona, the restoration of La Seu (the cathedral of Palma de Mallorca), and the Colònia Güell (factory town) in Santa Coloma de Cervelló, where Rubió built the agricultural cooperativa building with Francesc Berenguer in 1900, along with two private homes: Ca l'Ordal (1894) and Ca l'Espinal (1900). When designing houses the architect had a prevalence for bow window on the corners of his designs.

Rubió was also a regidor (councillor) on the Barcelona City Council (Ajuntament de Barcelona, 1905) and was appointed an architect for the Province of Barcelona (1906-1943) by the Barcelona Provincial Council (Diputació de Barcelona). His architecture is also prevalent on the Balearic Islands, for example in the northern town of Sóller, on Mallorca, where he designed the façade of the Church of Sant Bartomeu (1904) as well as the Banco de Sóller (1912), remarkable for its intricate ironwork (wrought iron).

Notable works and collaborations

Many of the following works are collaborations with Antoni Gaudí.
La Sagrada Familia
the Casa Batlló
the Casa Calvet
the Torre Bellesguard
Parc Güell in Barcelona
the restoration of La Seu (the cathedral of Palma de Mallorca)
1894: Ca l'Ordal -  - in Colònia Güell (factory town) in Santa Coloma de Cervelló
1900: agricultural cooperativa building with Francesc Berenguer - in Colònia Güell
1900: Ca l'Espinal - private home in Colònia Güell
1901: Casa Golferichs in Barcelona.
1904: façade of the church of Sant Bartomeu - Sóller, on Mallorca
1903-1909: Anti-tuberculosis sanatorium (Barcelona, Can Rectoret neighborhood) 
1912: façade of Banco de Sóller with intricate ironwork (wrought iron) - Sóller
1928: neo-gothic bridge over Carrer del Bisbe, in Barcelona.

Gallery

References

External links

Joan Rubió i Bellver
El Poder de la Palabra, Joan Rubió i Bellver

1870 births
1952 deaths
People from Reus
Architects from Catalonia
Modernisme architects